Satun (Northern Malay: Setoi) is one of the southern provinces (changwat) of Thailand. Neighboring provinces are (from north clockwise) Trang, Phatthalung, and Songkhla. To the south it borders Perlis of Malaysia.

Toponymy
The name Satun is a Thai version of its original Malay name, Setul (santol, or wild mangosteen tree). Setoi is the name of the province in Northern Malay dialect.

Geography
The province is on the Malay Peninsula, on the shore of the Andaman Sea. It is separated from Songkhla province by the Nakhon Si Thammarat mountain range, and from Malaysia by the Sankalakhiri mountains.

The Ko Tarutao and Ko Phetra marine national parks are part of the province. Close to the border with Malaysia is the Thale Ban National Park, a big freshwater swamp area.

National parks
There are three national parks, along with seventeen other national parks, make up region 5 (Nakhon Si Thammarat) of Thailand's protected areas.
 Tarutao National Park, 
 Mu Ko Phetra National Park, 
 Thale Ban National Park,

History
Until 1916 Satun was a small Malay state known as Kingdom of Setul Mambang Segara, closely related to Kedah Sultanate. After that date it was administered by a governor sent from Nakhon Si Thammarat. In 1897 Satun became part of Monthon Syburi (now Kedah), which in 1909 was divided between British Empire and Siam as part of Anglo-Siamese Treaty of 1909. While most of Kedah was ceded to Britain, Satun was awarded to Siam because it had a relatively large Thai population. Satun was then incorporated into Monthon Phuket. The monthon system was ended in 1933, and Satun province became a first-level subdivision of Thailand.

The province was to have been the site of the Pak Bara Deep-seaport in La-ngu District.

Symbols
The provincial seal shows Phra Samut Thewa (समुद्र देवा Samudra Deva, "God of the ocean") sitting on a rock in the sea, with the sunset behind. Phra Samut Thewa is a spirit who guards the sea. The rock is his divine vehicle. The sunset symbolizes the Andaman Sea, which lies to the west of the province.

The provincial tree is the Thai Rosewood or Pha-yungklaep (Dalbergia bariensis), and the provincial flower is the Snowy Orchid Tree (Bauhinia acuminata). The province's motto is Peaceful, clean, and pure nature.

Demographics

Like Narathiwat, Yala, and Pattani, Satun is one of the four provinces of Thailand which have a Muslim majority: 76.77 percent are Muslim and 23.02 percent are Buddhists. Most of the Muslims have some ethnic-Malay ancestry, though only 9.9 percent of the present-day population claims to be ethnically Malay, a result of the effective language shift process from Malay to Thai amongst its populace. The majority language in Satun province is Southern Thai, while the Malay dialect used in Satun is distinctly different from Patani Malay and is much closer to the Kedah dialect of Malay.

Since Satun had belonged to the Kedah Sultanate, which had a strong relationship for many centuries with both Ayutthaya and Siam under the Chakri dynasty, its Malay Muslims commonly intermarry with Thai Buddhists without serious religious hesitation. This custom has created a distinct social group known as samsam, meaning a mixed person. Most samsams, if not all, are Muslims.

Unlike the other Muslim majority provinces in Thailand, Satun does not have a history of political confrontation with the central power in Bangkok or of tension with the Buddhist population which makes up the majority of Thailand as a country. Malay Muslims in Satun are substantially assimilated and rarely sympathise with separatism from Thailand, in contrast to the Malay Muslims in Pattani, Narathiwat, and Yala.

Administrative divisions

Provincial government
Satun is divided into seven districts (amphoe). These are further divided into 36 subdistricts (tambon) and 277 villages (muban).

Originally, the province was divided into two districts, Mambang and Thung Wa, and the minor district (king amphoe) La-ngu. Due to the decline of pepper production in Thung Wa District, in 1930 the government made Thung Wa a minor district and instead declared La-ngu a district. In 1939 Mambang was renamed to Mueang Satun. Khuan Kalong was split off from Mueang district in 1969, from which in turn Tha Pae was split in 1976 and Manang in 1996. In 1973 Thung Wa regained district status. Khuan Don was established in 1975 by splitting it from Mueang district.

Local government
As of 26 November 2019 there are: one Satun Provincial Administration Organisation and 7 municipal (thesaban) areas in the province. Satun has town (thesaban mueang) status. Further 6 subdistrict municipalities (thesaban tambon). The non-municipal areas are administered by 34 Subdistrict Administrative Organisations - SAO (ongkan borihan suan tambon).

Economy
According to a Satun Provincial Office spokesman, the province's tourism income rose from two to 6.3 billion baht from 2010 to 2013, while tourist arrivals increased from 690,000 to 1.13 million.

The Department of Airports announced in October 2018 that it will conduct a feasibility study of an airport in the province. Six million baht is allocated for the study, to be completed in September 2019.

Transportation

Boat
Satun is connected to Malaysian Langkawi Island by direct ferry service.

Human achievement index 2017

Since 2003, United Nations Development Programme (UNDP) in Thailand has tracked progress on human development at sub-national level using the Human achievement index (HAI), a composite index covering all the eight key areas of human development. National Economic and Social Development Board (NESDB) has taken over this task since 2017.

National parks
 Mu Ko Phetra National Park is a marine national park in the Strait of Malacca off Thailand, covering mostly intact coastal line, open water, and about 30 islands of the southern part of Trang province and the northern part of Satun province. Established on 31 December 1984, it is the 49th national park and 14th marine national park of Thailand.

 Thale Ban National Park is a forested area south of the Banthat Mountains in southern Thailand, in the south of Satun province bordering Malaysia; it borders Taman Negeri Perlis park. The park was established on 27 October 1980.
 Tarutao National Park is Thailand's second marine national park on 19 April 1974. The coastal Khao Sam Roi Yot National Park had been designated in 1966.

Gallery

References

External links

Website of the province 

 
Provinces of Thailand
Southern Thailand
Strait of Malacca